Leontochroma is a genus of moths belonging to the subfamily Tortricinae of the family Tortricidae.

Species
Leontochroma aurantiacum Walsingham, 1900
Leontochroma percornutum Diakonoff, 1976
Leontochroma suppurpuratum Walsingham, 1900
Leontochroma viridochraceum Walsingham, 1900

Former species
Leontochroma antitona (Meyrick, 1927)

See also
List of Tortricidae genera

References

 , 1900, Ann. Mag. nat. Hist. (7) 5: 466.
 ,2005 World Catalogue of Insects 5

External links
tortricidae.com

Archipini
Tortricidae genera